Peter Farmer FRSC, CChem (born 1947) is a British toxicologist.

Farmer spent most of his early career as a researcher with the Toxicology Unit at the Medical Research Council.

In 2002 he was appointed joint Director of the MRC's Cancer Biomarkers and Prevention ESS (external scientific staff ) Group at the University of Leicester. He was also an Honorary Professor in Biochemistry and Cancer Studies at Leicester, becoming emeritus on retirement.

He served as chair of the Government Advisory Committee on Mutagenicity of Chemicals in Food, Consumer Products and the Environment, beginning in 2001.

References

External links 

 
 

1947 births
British toxicologists
British medical researchers
Fellows of the Royal College of Surgeons
Living people
Academics of the University of Leicester